Amblyseius tamatavensis is a species of mite in the family Phytoseiidae.

References

External links

 

tamatavensis
Articles created by Qbugbot
Animals described in 1974